Sľažany is a village and municipality in Zlaté Moravce District of the Nitra Region, in western-central Slovakia.

History
In historical records the village was first mentioned in 1156.

Geography
The municipality lies at an altitude of 200 metres, covering an area of 16.274 km², in the northern part of Žitavská pahorkatina (part of the Danubian Lowland). 

The Tribeč mountain range is located to the north of the village.

Demographics
According to the 2019 census, the municipality has a population of about 1685 people. In 2011, 96.7% of inhabitants were Slovaks, 0.65% are Hungarians and 0.24% Czechs. The religious makeup was 90.7% Roman Catholic and 5.6% unaffiliated.

References

External links
http://www.e-obce.sk/obec/slazany/slazany.html

Villages and municipalities in Zlaté Moravce District